Mohammad Ali (19 April 1931 – 19 March 2006) was a Pakistani actor. He was known as Shahenshah-e-Jazbaat 
(), meaning The Emperor of Emotions. A versatile performer, he acted in dramatic, romantic, and historical movies. He was voted among 25 of the greatest actors of Asia in a 2010 CNN poll.

Early life
Mohammad Ali was born in Rampur, United Provinces, British India on 19 April 1931. He was the son of Maulana Syed Murshid Ali, who was an Islamic scholar. He was the youngest of two brothers and two sisters. After his birth the family migrated from Rampur to Rohtak, and from there to Hyderabad, finally settling in Multan shortly after the independence of Pakistan in 1947.

He attended the Millat High School, Multan. He further studied in Government Emerson College, Multan. In 1954, he moved to Hyderabad to pursue higher studies and obtained a BA from City College, Hyderabad.

Career

Start of career from Radio Pakistan
Muhammad Ali joined Radio Pakistan Hyderabad station as a broadcaster in 1956, where his elder brother Irshad was already working as a drama artist. After a while, he moved to the Bahawalpur radio station and eventually to Radio Pakistan, Karachi where its then Director General Zulfiqar Ali Bukhari became his mentor for his acting career.

Film career
Zulfiqar Ali Bukhari, Director General, Radio Pakistan introduced him to the film producer Fazal Ahmed Kareem Fazli.
 
So Mohammad Ali started his film career with Fazal Ahmad Karim Fazli's film Chiragh Jalta Raha (1962).
Chiragh Jalta Raha was premiered by Fatima Jinnah on 9 March 1962 at Nishat Cinema, Karachi.  He then appeared as a villain in director Munawwar Rasheed's film Bahadur, director Iqbal Yusuf's film Daal Mein Kala, and director Javed Hashmi's film Dil Ne Tujhay Maan Liya. His first film as a hero was Mr. X but Movie Shararat (1963) was released earlier than film Mr. X. Later, he moved to Lahore and worked in the movie Khandan (1964). But his breakthrough was from the film Khamosh Raho (1964).  In 1989, he had an extended cameo in the Hindi film Clerk.

Mohammad Ali was the lead actor and  'hero' in 94 films. His first lead actor movie was Shararat (1963) and his last movie as a lead actor was Aaj Ki Raat (1983). Another movie was Mohabbat ho to aisi (1989) and his last movie of his career was titled Dum Mast Qalander (1995).

Playback singers
Ali was most often voiced by Mehdi Hassan and Ahmed Rushdi. Mehdi Hassan sang 115 songs for Ali in his 88 movies. Rushdi sang 100 songs in 57 movies for Ali. Masood Rana sang 34 songs for Ali in his 23 films. Others who provided their voice were Akhlaq Ahmed, Ghulam Abbas, Rajab Ali and Mujeeb Aalam.

Marriage to actress Zeba 
Ali met Zeba the first time in 1962 during the filming of their debut film "Chirag Jalta Raha (1962)". The couple got married four years later during the filming of Tum mile pyar mila on 29 September 1966 and remained married until Ali's death in 2006.

They did not have any children together. However, Mohammad Ali legally adopted Samina, Zeba's daughter from her previous marriage, giving her the name Samina Ali.

Political and social activism
Mohammad Ali and his wife Zeba both had close relations with different political regimes in the country. He protested by putting up black dress in International Moscow Film Festival against India for holding 93,000 POWs after the 1971 war. In Nawaz Sharif's government, he also served as Cultural Minister and introduced new policies to improve the condition of Pakistani film Industry.

Ali-Zaib Foundation
Muhammad Ali along with Shahid Ali Zaidi founded Ali-Zaib Foundation in 1995 to help the Thalassemia patients. The foundation built hospitals in Sargodha, Sahiwal, Jhang, Gujranwala, Okara with Foundation's Head Office in Faisalabad.

Retirement from films and his death

After his retirement from films, when Mohammad Ali was asked in a television show about his disassociation from the films, he said: "The atmosphere in which I was accustomed to work for films and the way films are made now, have entirely changed, hence I called it quits."
He was very generous and warm towards his fans. One of the best Pashto poets Zahir Shah Zahir has dedicated all his poetry to Mohammad Ali which includes more than ten books. The poet used to visit his house and have long discussions about the social welfare of people and Pakistani society. 

Mohammad Ali died on 19 March 2006 due to a heart attack in Lahore.

Awards and recognition
He won 10 Nigar awards in his long film career starting from 1964 to 1984.
 Nigar Award for Best Supporting Actor in film Khamosh Raho (1964)
 Nigar Award for Best Actor in film Kaneez (1965)
 Nigar Award for Best Actor in film Aag Ka Darya (1966)
 Nigar Award for Best Actor in film Saiqa (1968)
 Nigar Award for Best Actor in film Insaan Aur Aadmi (1970)
 Nigar Award for Best Actor for Wehshi (1971)
 Nigar Award for Best Actor in film Aas (1973) 
 Nigar Award for Best Actor for film Aaina Aur Soorat (1974) 
 Nigar Award for Best Actor for film Haidar Ali (1978)
 Special Nigar Award in 1984 for films Doorian and Bobby 
 Pride of Performance Award by the President of Pakistan in 1984 which is the third highest civilian award in Pakistan from former president Zia ul Haq in recognition of his lifelong services to the entertainment industry of Pakistan. Later, he was also honoured with Tamgha-e-Imtiaz (Medal of Excellence), the second highest civilian award in Pakistan.

He received many honours and special awards like the Millennium Legend Star Graduate Award in 2000, Ilyas Rasheedi Gold medal 1998, Nigar Lifetime Achievement Award 1998, Nigar Millennium Award 2000, Lifetime Excellency Award 1997, Pakistan Best Personality Award 1997. He received Bolan Awards, Screen Light Awards, National Academy Awards, Critics Award, Cultural Award from Punjab University and an Asian Academy Award. He received the first foreign award Al-Nasr Award in Dubai 1984. He was also awarded the Naushad Award of India.

Filmography

See also
List of Urdu-language films
List of Lollywood actors

References

External links
 

1931 births
2006 deaths
Pakistani male film actors
Recipients of Tamgha-e-Imtiaz
Recipients of the Pride of Performance
Nigar Award winners
Muhajir people
Male actors from Lahore
People from Hyderabad, Sindh
People from Hyderabad District, Pakistan
Government Emerson College alumni